Melanohalea mexicana is a species of lichen in the family Parmeliaceae. Found in Mexico, it was described as a new species in 2010 by Ted Esslinger and Rosa Emilia Pérez-Pérez. Within the genus Melanohalea, molecular phylogenetic analysis places it in the "subolivacea" group, which includes the species M. subolivacea and M. clairi.

References

mexicana
Lichen species
Lichens described in 2010
Lichens of Mexico